René Léonard (23 June 1889 - 15 August 1965) was a French racing driver who, along with André Lagache, won the inaugural running of the 24 Hours of Le Mans in .

Career
Léonard and Lagache were both engineers for the Chenard et Walcker automobile company, and were chosen to drive one of the three entries in the endurance event.  Their "Sport" model finished by a four lap margin over another Chenard et Walcker. They drove together the next two years, but failed to finish either time.

He drove with Lagache to win the second edition of the Spa 24 Hours in 1925, and the pair also finished third in 1926. Léonard won the 1926 Gran Premio de Turismo, a 12-hour race for touring cars held at Circuito Lasarte in Guipúzcoa, Spain.

Following the 1926 season, Chenard et Walcker withdrew from competition. However, in 1932, he was seen driving one of their cars in the Lisieux hillclimb and a one-kilometre race in Strasbourg. The same year, he moved to Saint-Gratien to be near to the company's factory.

Racing record

Complete 24 Hours of Le Mans results

External links 
René Léonard at racingsportscars.com.

References

1889 births
1965 deaths
French racing drivers
24 Hours of Le Mans drivers
24 Hours of Spa drivers
24 Hours of Le Mans winning drivers